Hollister is a city in Twin Falls County, Idaho, United States. The population was 272 at the 2010 census. It is part of the Twin Falls, Idaho Micropolitan Statistical Area.

Geography
Hollister is located at  (42.352174, -114.580443), on the east bank of Salmon Falls Creek.

Demographics

2010 census
As of the census of 2010, there were 272 people, 92 households, and 64 families residing in the city. The racial makeup of the city was 83.1% White, 0.4% Native American, 12.1% from other races, and 4.4% from two or more races. Hispanic or Latino of any race were 29.0% of the population.

There were 92 households, of which 38.0% had children under the age of 18 living with them, 60.9% were married couples living together, 3.3% had a female householder with no husband present, 5.4% had a male householder with no wife present, and 30.4% were non-families. 20.7% of all households were made up of individuals, and 8.7% had someone living alone who was 65 years of age or older. The average household size was 2.96 and the average family size was 3.41.

The median age in the city was 39 years. 29.8% of residents were under the age of 18; 6.9% were between the ages of 18 and 24; 22.1% were from 25 to 44; 26.2% were from 45 to 64; and 15.1% were 65 years of age or older. The gender makeup of the city was 49.6% male and 50.4% female.

2000 census
As of the census of 2000, there were 237 people, 80 households, and 58 families residing in the city. The racial makeup of the city was 85.23% White, 2.95% Native American, 9.28% from other races, and 2.53% from two or more races. Hispanic or Latino of any race were 18.57% of the population.

There were 80 households, out of which 42.5% had children under the age of 18 living with them, 63.8% were married couples living together, 6.3% had a female householder with no husband present, and 27.5% were non-families. 17.5% of all households were made up of individuals, and 6.3% had someone living alone who was 65 years of age or older.  The average household size was 2.96 and the average family size was 3.41.

In the city, the population was spread out, with 32.9% under the age of 18, 8.0% from 18 to 24, 29.1% from 25 to 44, 21.9% from 45 to 64, and 8.0% who were 65 years of age or older.  The median age was 34 years. For every 100 females, there were 94.3 males.  For every 100 females age 18 and over, there were 103.8 males.

The median income for a household in the city was $27,375, and the median income for a family was $29,688. Males had a median income of $25,313 versus $15,556 for females. The per capita income for the city was $11,870.  About 7.8% of families and 11.0% of the population were below the poverty line, including none of those under the age of eighteen or sixty five or over.

Education
Hollister Elementary School accommodates students ages K-5. After fifth grade, local students attend school in Filer.

References

Cities in Idaho
Cities in Twin Falls County, Idaho
Twin Falls, Idaho metropolitan area